The Village of Loch Lloyd is a private gated resort-like community in northwestern Cass County, Missouri, United States, which lies adjacent the Kansas border on the south side of the Kansas City metropolitan area. The population was 600 at the 2010 census. It incorporated on September 3, 2003.

The village of Loch Lloyd is built around a 110-acre lake on Mill Creek (a tributary of the Blue River) and the original golf course designed by Donald Sechrest and the newly designed Tom Watson Signature Design golf course which opened in 2012. Loch Lloyd derives its name from the original real estate developer Harry J. Lloyd, who died in 1997.

In 2002, the development at Loch Lloyd and The Country Club at Loch Lloyd were acquired by FiveStar Lifestyles. This company has built over 200 homes at an average price of $850,000.

The original golf course was designed by Donald Sechrest and opened in 1991. The Country Club at Loch Lloyd hosted a Senior PGA Tour tournament from 1991 to 1998.

Geography
The ZIP code of 64012 is shared with Belton.

Demographics

When Loch Lloyd incorporated, its population was 136. The United States census reported it had a population of 368 and 175 housing units in September 2005. When the village filed the paperwork to incorporate, they said they wanted to incorporate as an independent village rather than being annexed by Kansas City or Belton.

2010 Census
As of the census of 2010, there were 600 people, 252 households, and 220 families residing in the village. The racial makeup of the village was 94.7% White, 3.2% African American, 1.2% Asian, 0.5% from other races, and 0.5% from two or more races. Hispanic or Latino of any race were 1.5% of the population.

There were 252 households, of which 17.5% had children under the age of 18 living with them, 83.3% were married couples living together, 2.4% had a female householder with no husband present, 1.6% had a male householder with no wife present, and 12.7% were non-families. 9.9% of all households were made up of individuals, and 4.4% had someone living alone who was 65 years of age or older. The average household size was 2.38 and the average family size was 2.55.

The median age in the village was 55.5 years. 14.3% of residents were under the age of 18; 3.4% were between the ages of 18 and 24; 12.7% were from 25 to 44; 44.5% were from 45 to 64; and 25.2% were 65 years of age or older. The gender makeup of the village was 49.2% male and 50.8% female.

Education
Belton School District is the local school district. Its comprehensive high school is Belton High School.

Notable people
Loch Lloyd received national attention in July 2007, when evangelist Tammy Faye Messner died at her home on the lake there.

References

External links

Villages in Cass County, Missouri
Populated places established in 2003
Villages in Missouri